Saša Kovačević may refer to:
 Saša Kovačević (footballer)
 Saša Kovačević (singer)